Tambaram Lalitha (also known as Thambaram Lalitha, Tambaram N. Lalitha) was an Indian stage and film actress who acted in about 100 films as heroine and in supporting roles.

She died in 1983.

Partial filmography

 Town Bus (1955)
 Kokilavani (1956)
 Paditha Penn (1956)
 Amudhavalli (1959)
 Bhaaga Pirivinai (1959) as Amutha 
 Mamiyar Mechina Marumagal (1959)
 Orey Vazhi (1959)
 Sahodhari (1959) as Thangam 
 Sivagangai Seemai (1959)
 Thalai Koduthaan Thambi (1959) as Princess 
 Veerapandiya Kattabomman (1959) as Valli
 Aalukkoru Veedu (1960)
 Chavukkadi Chandrakantha (1960)
 Deivapiravi (1960) as Nandhini
 Meenda Sorgam (1960) as Prabha Hero's wife who commits suicide later
 Thilakam (1960) 
 Kappalottiya Thamizhan (1961)
 Kongunattu Thangam (1961)
 Vazhikatti (1965)
 Neelagiri Express (1968) as Geetha's mother
 Aayiram Poi (1969) as Kalyani
 Ponnu Mappillai (1969)
 Karundhel Kannayiram (1972)
 Manjal Kungumam (1973)
 Andharangam (1975)
 Shri Kanchi Kamakshi (1978) as Kali
 Gnana Kuzhandhai (1979) as Sivanesan's Wife
 Pasi (1979) as Valliamma

References

Bibliography

1983 deaths
Indian film actresses
Actresses in Tamil cinema
Tamil actresses
Indian stage actresses
20th-century Indian actresses